Joshipur  is Rural Municipality in Kailali District of Sudurpashchim Province established by merging  Bauniya and Joshipur two existing village development committees. Joshipur lies 75 km east of Dhangadhi and 61 3 km west of the capital, Kathmandu. It is surrounded by Lamki Chuha Municipality , Tikapur Municipality  and Janaki Rural Municipality in the East , Ghodaghodi Municipality and Bhajani Municipality in the West , Bardagoriya Rural Municipality in the North and Bhajani Municipality in the South .

Temples
 Ram Janaki Mandir, Jabahi
 Shree Someswarnath Mandir, Badhariya
 Shree Baneshwar baba sibha Mandir Dham, Bani

See also
 Sudurpashchim Province
 Kailali District
 Lamki Chuha Municipality

References

External links
UN map of the municipalities of Kailali District

Populated places in Kailali District
Rural municipalities in Kailali District
Rural municipalities of Nepal established in 2017